Gebhard of Lahngau ( 860/868 – 22 June 910), of the Conradine dynasty, son of Odo (died 879), count of Lahngau, and Judith, was himself count of Wetterau (909–910) and Rheingau (897–906) and then duke of Lotharingia (Lorraine).

In 903, Louis the Child, king of Germany, gave him the government of Lotharingia with the title of duke (Kebehart dux regni quod a multis Hlotharii dicitur). Gebhard died in battle against the Magyars, somewhere by Augsburg.

With his wife Ida, he had two children:
Herman (died 949), duke of Swabia
Odo (died 949), count of Wetterau (from 914), Lahngau (from 918), and Rheingau (from 917), married Cunigunda, daughter of Herbert I of Vermandois

Ancestry

References

Sources

|-

Dukes of Lorraine
Military personnel killed in action
Conradines
860s births
910 deaths
Year of birth uncertain